Sports is an integral  part of  culture in Maharashtra. Cricket is the most popular spectator sport in this state.

Kabaddi, field hockey, Kho Kho, badminton, and table tennis are also played in urban areas in schools- colleges, except Kho-kho and Kabbadi which is played rural areas of the state. In the state's southern rural regions, wrestling championships such as Hind Kesari and Maharashtra Kesari annually take place. Among minors in the state, games like Viti-Dandu and various Tag sports are played.

Maharashtra Cricket Association governs the cricket in this state except Mumbai region etc. International standard stadium such as Wankhede stadium, Maharashtra Cricket Association Stadium of cricket are present in Mumbai, Pune respectively. Maharashtra cricket team represents the state in Indian domestic cricket. This state's Mumbai cricket team represents Mumbai district, Palghar district and Thane district in domestic cricket. IPL, Women's Premier League franchises Mumbai Indians, its womens' team is based in Mumbai. 

Maharashtra Open a ATP Tour 250 tournament annually held in Balewadi Stadium, Pune.

History

Pre-colonial sports 
In ancient India, martial arts  called Mallavidya was practiced. The martial art was practiced in earthen mud pits called Akhadas or Talims, some of which can still be found in Maharashtra today. Mallavidya was a form of grappling that was more complex than wrestling, and examples of the martial art can be seen on archaeological sculptures from the region at numerous locations, such as Kharosa or Pavnar.

Baji Rao II, the last Peshwa of the Maratha Empire, was a patron of strength and wrestling competitions during the early 19th century. Under his patronage, the sport of pole gymnastics (called Malkhamb) was developed in Pune by Balambhat Deodhar. After Baji Rao lost power and was exiled to northern India, Deodhar brought Malkhamb and Mallavidya to other Maratha-ruled states such as Baroda and Gwalior. In the later 19th and early 20th centuries, other rulers such as those of Kolhapur and Aundh were also patrons of organised wrestling and sporting festivals. Among these rulers of these princely states, horse riding, wrestling, fencing, archery, and shooting gained popularity.

Imported sports under British rule 
British rule in India drastically changed the landscape of sports in Maharastra. Like in other regions of India, British rulers and aristocrats enjoyed outdoor sports and built facilities for their own leisure. This led to the introduction of several British sports such as cricket and the development of the new game of badminton. New infrastructure such as the building of a dam at Bund gardens in 1860 allowed for recreational boating on the Mula-Mutha river. In addition, the colonial rulers introduced horse racing. Race courses built during this period such as the Mahalaxmi Racecourse and Pune Race Course are still in operation today.

By the late 19th century, the British had constructed numerous sports clubs which were exclusively white or restricted based on religion. These included Poona Europeans, Poona Parsees, and Poona Hindu Gymkhana. While many of these clubs based on religion were dominated by educated Brahmins, there were some lower-caste stars such as brothers, Palwankar Baloo and Vithal Palwankar who played cricket in the early 20th century.

Indigenous sports under British rule 
At the same time that imported sports were being developed by the British, indigenous sports continued to change and develop as well. However, after Indian Civil Service officer Walter Rand was assassinated in 1897 by the Chapekar brothers, who ran a wrestling venue in Pune, British colonial authorities viewed these indigenous sports venues with suspicion. A committee was established in 1914 in order to set rules for kho-kho. The formalization of Indian sports continued in the region, and the Deccan Gymkhana sports club was instrumental in organizing the first Indian delegation to an Olympic games, which participated in the 1920 games in Antwerp. Other clubs, such as the Maharashtra Mandal club which formed in the early 20th century, promoted physical culture and education by hosting both indigenous and western sports.

Other new indigenous sports and exercises developed as well, especially yoga and related exercises. In the 1920s, Bhawanrao Shriniwasrao Pant Pratinidhi, the ruler of Aundh, helped popularize the series of yoga positions called Surya Namaskar, a flowing sequence of salutations to the sun. This series contained popular asanas (positions) such as upward and downward dog and Uttanasana which helped to popularize yoga as exercise.

Beginning in the 1910s, local Indian organizations were established in order to propagate and develop Indian physical culture. One such organization, initially called Hanuman akhara, was formed in 1922 by the Vaidya brothers in Amravati and eventually became the Hanuman Vyayam Prasarak mandal (HVPM). A satellite organization of the HVPM helped to revise the rules for kabaddi in the 1930s after the Indian YMCA had first formulated the rules in earlier years.

Administration
The Directorate of Sports and Youth Services (Maharashtra) is the governing body which is  responsible for sports in Maharashtra. The directorate is a part of the School Education and Sports Department of the Government of Maharashtra and is let by the Sports and Youth Welfare Minister of Maharashtra.

The Maharashtra Olympic Association, affiliated with the Indian Olympic Association, is responsible for the selection and participation of the state's contingent in the Olympic Games, Commonwealth Games, Asian Games, and for the South Asian Games in Maharashtra.

The Maharashtra Cricket Association is the governing body for cricket activities in the state of Maharashtra and for the Maharashtra cricket team. It is affiliated with the Board of Control for Cricket in India. The Maharashtra Cricket Association is one of three cricket associations based in Maharashtra, along with Mumbai Cricket Association and Vidarbha Cricket Association.

The Western India Football Association (WIFA) is the governing body for football in Maharashtra. It is affiliated with the All India Football Federation, the sport's national governing body for all of India. The WIFA was established on 12 July 1911.

Sports policy 
The Maharashtra Government announced its first sports policy in 1996, and was the first Indian state to do so. After five years, in 2001, the state government launched a second sports policy for a ten year period which had the motto "Fitness for all through Sports". As a part of this policy, the Sports Infrastructure Development Plan was created. In addition, a reservation was made for a sportsperson in government and semi-government jobs in the 2001 policy. In 2012, a third sports policy was declared which enabled financial assistance in order to prepare the state for participation in international competitions.

Indigenous sports 
A number of Indian sports originated in Maharashtra or were formalised there. These include badminton, kabaddi, kho kho, atya patya, langdi, and mallakhamba. In rural areas of Maharashtra, kusti (Indian mud wrestling) and bullock cart competitions can regularly be seen during the annual jatra carnival. The Maharashtran government has supported kusti in the state by constructing two permanent training centers for the sport in the Kolhapur area.

Indian wrestling

Today, wrestling is a very popular sport in Maharashtra. Despite cricket's dominance in most of India, wrestling has maintained its popularity in Maharashtra, especially in the rural regions of the state and Kolhapur district. One famous wrestler from the state was Khashaba Jadhav, who was the first Indian from the newly independent Indian nation to win an Olympic medal in an individual sport when he won a bronze medal in the 1952 Helsinki Olympics.

Wrestling typically takes place in a clay or dirt pit. The soil is mixed with ghee and other materials and is tended too before each practice or match. This style of traditional wrestling, called kusti, encompasses more than just a sport for its athletes. Wrestlers are a part of an ancient subculture, living and training together and following strict rules on diet and leisure. The focus is on living a pure life and building one's strength and skills, and as such drinking, smoking, and sex are off limits. The wrestlers' diets consist of milk, almonds, ghee, eggs, and chapattis. Kusti represents the intersection of sports, politics, and culture and is deeply embedded in the agrarian economy of rural Maharashtra.

Another style of wrestling popular in Maharashtra is Hind Kesari, a wrestling championship established in 1958. The championship is affiliated with the All India Amateur Wrestling Federation (AIAWF). Most common in the rural areas of western Maharashtra, wrestlers train in schools called taleems, in which wrestling gurus instruct students on both physical and moral instruction in a style of wrestling that blends spiritual and secular practices. The largest tournaments in the state draw top wrestlers from the region and even outside India, including from Pakistan, Iran, Turkey, and several African nations.

Field hockey

Field hockey is one of the more popular sports in Maharashtra. Up to thirty domestic tournaments of the sport are held in a calendar year in Pune alone, such as the All India Bombay Gold Cup Hockey Tournament and the All India Aagha Khan Hockey Tournament. The state is home to three hockey clubs playing in different leagues, and was also the home of a now defunct club called the Maratha Warriors who competed in the Premier Hockey League. The Mumbai Magicians are based in Mumbai and play in the Hockey India League. The Mumbai Marines are also based in Mumbai. The Pune Strykers are based in Pune and play in the World Series Hockey.

Mahindra Hockey Stadium serves as the home venue of the Mumbai Marines and Mumbai Magicians and used to be the home venue of the Maratha Warriors. Formerly known as the Bombay Hockey Association Stadium, the stadium hosted the 1982 Men's Hockey World Cup. PCMC Hockey Stadium serves as the home venue of the Pune Strykers.

Many individual Maharashtrian have also contributed to India's hockey legacy. Tushar Khandekar is referred to as "the Goal Poacher". Hiranna M. Nimal was a silver medalist at the 1962 Asian Games and also represented Maharashtra in many other National and International Leagues. Other notable hockey stars from the state include Dhanraj Pillay and Viren Rasquinha.

Cricket

Cricket is played at domestic and international levels in Maharashtra and is consistently supported by people from most parts of the state. Maharashtra is home to the Maharashtra cricket team, Vidarbha cricket team, Veer Marathi cricket franchise, Mumbai Indians, and the regionally dominant Mumbai cricket team. The Mumbai cricket team was the dominant franchise for much of the 20th century, winning the first Ranji Trophy Championship over North India in 1935 and winning fifteen consecutive Ranji Trophy victories from 1958-1973. Mumbai is the most successful team in the history of the Ranji Trophy championship, winning 40 titles over the course of its history, and is also the most successful team in the Irani Cup, with 16 titles won.

The Mumbai cricket team is overseen by the Mumbai Cricket Association and the Maharashtra cricket team is overseen by the Maharashtra Cricket Association. The Mumbai cricket team and Mumbai Indians both have their home grounds at Wankhede Stadium, an international cricket ground. Both teams play in the Indian Premier League, of which the Mumbai Indians was one of eight founding members in 2008.

Maharashtra is home to India's first cricket museum, Blades of Glory, which is based in Pune and run by Rohan Pate, a former cricketer, and which opened during the 2013 Indian Premier League season.

Football

Football is another popular sport in many parts of the state, with the FIFA World Cup and the English Premier League being followed widely. The Maharashtra Football Pyramid consists of district leagues, each of which are broken into sub-leagues. This pyramid operates during the whole calendar year, but at different times. In the I-League, Mumbai was represented by Mumbai FC, Mahindra United and Air-India. In Pune, Pune F.C. is a recently founded football club in the I-League which was established in August 2007. There is local rivalry among the Mumbai-based clubs Air India FC and Mumbai FC, and state rivalry with Pune FC. Matches between these teams are called the Maha Derby, as they are played in Maharashtra. Maharashtra is also represented in the Santosh Trophy by the Maharashtra football team, who last won the trophy in the 1999–2000 season.

The Western India Football Association (WIFA) signed a deal with Sporting Ace, a sports management company, to infuse new investments into Maharashtra football. The Mumbai District Football Association (MDFA) is the organisation responsible for association football in and around Mumbai. The MDFA organises around seven leagues which contain more than 300 club sides in total, in addition to being responsible for six of India's I-League sides.

Seven-a-side football is also hugely popular in Maharashtra. The eighth Motilal Mathurawala Trophy Seven-a-side Junior National Football Championship was held in Pune.

Football clubs in Maharashtra

American football
Maharashtra has two club franchises which play American football in the Elite Football League of India. The Mumbai Gladiators is a team based in Mumbai and the Pune Marathas is a team based in Pune with the Shree Shiv Chhatrapati Sports Complex as its home stadium. Maharashtra hosted the First Youth National American Football Championship in 2007 in which the Mumbai Gladiators and Pune Marathas played their first match against each other. However, neither team won the championship, which was instead won by the visiting Manipur team.

Derby (Horse racing)

The horse racing season in Maharashtra starts in mid-November and ends in the last week of April. Every February, Mumbai holds derby races at the Mahalaxmi Racecourse. Since 1986, McDowell's Indian Derby has been sponsored by liquor baron Vijay Mallya's UB Group as The McDowell's Indian Derby. The Mahalaxmi Racecourse horse racing track is one of the two racecourse in Maharashtra. The Mahalaxmi Racecourse was built in 1883 and modelled on the Caulfield Racecourse in Melbourne.

Grand Prix
In March 2004, the Mumbai Grand Prix was part of the F1 powerboat world championship, and the Force India F1 team car was unveiled in Mumbai in 2008. The city plans to build its own F1 track and various sites were assessed, of which the authorities have narrowed down to either Marve-Malad or Panvel-Kalyan.

Marathon

Mumbai Marathon
In 2004, the annual Mumbai Marathon was established as a part of "The Greatest Race on Earth". The Mumbai Marathon is an annual international marathon held on the third Sunday of January. The Standard Chartered Mumbai Marathon is India's biggest charity platform.

Pune Marathon
Pune International Marathon is an annual marathon established in 1983 which is held in Pune. Pune Marathon is the first Indian Marathon to be certified by the AIMS. The Athletics Federation of India has awarded the status of National Marathon Championship to the Pune International Marathon. Funds raised from the race are donated to Project Concern International, an NGO working towards HIV/AIDS awareness and prevention.

Tennis

ATP 250 Maharashtra Open is annually organise in Pune. It is India's only international level Tennis tournament, singles and doubles male players the country and abroad participate in it. It is organised by Maharashtra lawn Tennis association, which is the governing body of this sport in the state.

Maharashtra has a franchise-based tennis league, the Maharashtra Tennis League (MTL), which is India's first league format in tennis. The MTL launched with a total of 80 players and five teams: the Mumbai Blasters, Sharp Smashers, Baseline Bombers, Accurate Aces, and Dazzling Deuces. Each team in the league consists of six players, at least two of which must be girls and at least one of which must be from Maharashtra.

One famous Maharashtrian tennis player was Gaurav Natekar, a former Davis Cup player and seven-time Indian National Tennis Champion. He was awarded the Arjuna Award in 1996 for Tennis.

Mumbai has hosted the Kingfisher Airlines Tennis Open, an International Series tournament of the ATP World Tour, in 2006 and 2007. The 2006 and 2007 Kingfisher Airlines Tennis Open tennis tournaments were played on outdoor hard courts in Maharashtra. The 2006 and 2007 tournaments took place at the Cricket Club of India in Mumbai.

Chess

Maharashtra has a five-decade-long chess culture. The first chess association in Maharashtra was formed in 1921 and was known as th South Maharashtra Chess Club. The Sangali Chess Society was established in 1930. The Southern Maratha Country Chess Association originated in 1955. With the growth of the game in the state, the first chess body in Mumbai, known as the Bombay Chess Association, was established in 1944. Open chess tournaments started in the city in 1945. Then, in 1950, the All India Chess Federation was started in Mumbai and held tournaments at the nationallLevel for five years afterwards in Mumbai. The first Inter-State Championship was held in 1960. In 1963, the Bombay Chess Association and Southern Maratha Country Chess Association merged to form the Maharashtra Chess Association.

The Maharashtra Chess League, the first-ever IPL style chess league in India, started the PYC Hindu Gymkhana club in Pune on 24 April 2013. The tournament played on a league-cum-knock-out basis. Each team played the other five teams once, with the top four teams at the end of the league stage making it to the semifinals.

Maharashtra has produced many notable chess players, including Abhijit Kunte, Praveen Thipsay, Rohini Khadilkar, and Anupama Gokhale.

See also

 Sport in India
 Outline of Maharashtra
 Marathi people
 Culture of Maharashtra

References

External links

 
 
 Maharashtra Amateur Athletic Association
 Para Athletic Association of Maharashtra